Nicholas Addison Phillips, Baron Phillips of Worth Matravers,  (born 21 January 1938) is a British former senior judge.

Phillips was the inaugural President of the Supreme Court of the United Kingdom, holding office between October 2009 and October 2012. He was the last Senior Lord of Appeal in Ordinary and the first Lord Chief Justice of England and Wales to be head of the English judiciary when that function was transferred from the Lord Chancellor in April 2006. Before his chief justiceship, he was Master of the Rolls from 2000 to 2005. He sits as a crossbencher.

Early life
Phillips was born 21 January 1938. He was educated at Bryanston School (where he was appointed a governor of the school in 1975, he has been chairman of its governors since 1981). He undertook National Service with the Royal Navy and the Royal Naval Volunteer Reserve, being commissioned as an officer.

After two years' military service he went to King's College, Cambridge, where he read law. In 1962, he was called to the Bar at the Middle Temple, where he was a Harmsworth Scholar. He undertook pupillage at 2 Essex Court Chambers (with the Anglo-American QC, Waldo Porges) and subsequently obtained a tenancy there, later moving to 1 Brick Court (now Brick Court Chambers). In 1973, he was appointed as Junior Counsel to the Ministry of Defence and to the Treasury in Maritime and Admiralty matters. On 4 April 1978, he became Queen’s Counsel.

Judicial career
In 1982, Phillips was appointed a Recorder and from 1987 was a full-time High Court Judge on the Queen's Bench Division, with the customary knighthood. He took an interest in legal training, and was Chairman of the Council of Legal Education from 1992 to 1997. He presided over several complex fraud trials including those covering the Robert Maxwell pension fund fraud and Barlow Clowes. In 1995, he became a Lord Justice of Appeal and was appointed to the Privy Council.

On 12 January 1999, he was appointed a Lord of Appeal in Ordinary and created a Life Peer under the Appellate Jurisdiction Act 1876 as Baron Phillips of Worth Matravers, of Belsize Park in the London Borough of Camden.

He then succeeded Harry, Lord Woolf as Master of the Rolls on 6 June 2000. He conducted an inquiry into the outbreak of bovine spongiform encephalopathy. He served as Lord Chief Justice of England and Wales from 2005 to 2008, when he was reappointed as a Law Lord.

Since 2008, Phillips was the Senior Lord of Appeal in Ordinary until he became the first president of the Supreme Court of the United Kingdom on 1 October 2009.

Queen Elizabeth II elevated him as a Knight Companion of the Order of the Garter on 23 April 2011.

On 11 October 2011, Phillips announced his retirement on 30 September 2012, almost four months before the mandatory retirement age for British judges at turning 75 on 21 January 2013.

After retiring from the bench, Phillips followed Woolf as president of the Qatar International Court at Doha He served on the court from 2012 to 2018. He also acts as an arbitrator.

In March 2012, the Government of Hong Kong SAR appointed Phillips as a Non-Permanent Judge of the Hong Kong Court of Final Appeal. He also serves as President of the British Maritime Law Association and Chairman of the European Maritime Law Organisation.

Personal life
Phillips is currently married to Christylle Marie-Thérèse Rouffiac, and lives in Hampstead, London. One of his two children is novelist Marie Phillips.

Phillips is a member of Brooks's and the Garrick Clubs. He was also appointed the inaugural Distinguished Fellow and visiting professor of The Dickson Poon School of Law, King's College London.

He received honorary degrees of Doctor of Laws (Hon. LLD) from Exeter (1998), Birmingham (2003), London (2004), Wake Forest University (2010), and the International Institute of Maritime Law, and of Doctor of Civil Law (Hon. DCL) from City University, London (2003). 

Phillips served as Chancellor of Bournemouth University from 2009 until 2018, being succeeded by broadcaster and author, Kate Adie.

Styles
 Nicholas Phillips Esq (birth–1978)
 Nicholas Phillips Esq QC (1978–1987)
 Mr Justice Phillips (1987–1995)
 Lord Justice Phillips PC (1995–1999)
 The Rt Hon The Lord Phillips of Worth Matravers PC (1999–2011)
 The Rt Hon The Lord Phillips of Worth Matravers KG PC (2011–present)

Arms

See also
Decided cases
Great Peace Shipping Ltd v Tsavliris (International) Ltd [2003] QB 679
Shogun Finance Ltd v Hudson [2004] 1 AC 919
Moore Stephens v Stone Rolls Ltd (in liq) [2009] 1 AC 1391
R v Gnango [2012] 1 AC 827

References

External links
Dyer, Clare, He pointed a finger where it ought to be pointed. He didn't go over the top ... He has shown himself to be politic, The Guardian, 23 September 2005.
BSE enquiry, UK Government
Ministry of Justice: President, Supreme Court
Phillips interviewed by ReConstitution, sharing views on the new UK's Supreme Court and the role of the Judiciary.
 Interviewed by Alan Macfarlane 7 February 2014 (video)

1938 births
People from Hampstead
Royal Navy officers
20th-century English judges
20th-century King's Counsel
English King's Counsel
Knights Bachelor
Knights of the Garter
Living people
Lord chief justices of England and Wales
Law lords
Senior Lords of Appeal in Ordinary
Crossbench life peers
People educated at Bryanston School
Alumni of King's College, Cambridge
Members of the Privy Council of the United Kingdom
Queen's Bench Division judges
Members of the Middle Temple
Masters of the Rolls
Members of the Judicial Committee of the Privy Council
Judges of the Supreme Court of the United Kingdom
English barristers
Presidents of the Supreme Court of the United Kingdom
People associated with Bournemouth University
Justices of the Court of Final Appeal (Hong Kong)
Hong Kong judges
British people of Egyptian-Jewish descent
English Sephardi Jews
Jewish British politicians
21st-century English judges